Aikawa Station is the name of two train stations in Japan:

 Aikawa Station (Akita) in Kitaakita, Akita Prefecture
 Aikawa Station (Osaka) in Higashiyodogawa-ku, Osaka